People elected Fellow of the Royal Society in 1991.

Fellows

Paul Richard Adams
John Evan Baldwin  (1931–2010)
Michael John Bevan
Kenneth Noel Corbett Bray
Peter Elwood Bryant
Robert Wolfgang Cahn  (1924-2007)
John Lawrence Cardy
Brian Charlesworth
Bryan Randell Coles  (1926-1997)
Thomas Michael Dexter
David Headley Green
Franklin Gerardus Grosveld
Nigel James Hitchin
Sir Tim Hunt
David Stewart Jenkinson  (1928–2011)
Brian Frederick Gilbert Johnson
Philip Nicholas Johnson-Laird
Sir David King
Malcolm Douglas Lilly  (1936-1998)
George Owen Mackie
Allan Roy Mackintosh  (1936-1995)
Enid Anne Campbell MacRobbie
Michael David May
John Norman Murrell (1932–2016)
John Michael Newsom-Davis  (d. 2007)
Kenneth John Packer
John Roundell Palmer (b.1940) 4th Earl of Selborne (Statute)
Gerald Pattenden
Graham Garland Ross
Charles Robert Scriver
Christopher Roland Somerville
Andrew Michael Soward
Govind Swarup
Stephen Austen Thorpe
Lap-Chee Tsui
Leslie Valiant
Martin Paterson Vessey
Richard Irving Walcott
Kenneth Walters
Michael Derek Waterfield
Colin Edward Webb

Foreign members

Duilio Arigoni
Michael S Brown
Joseph L Goldstein
Hendrik Christoffel van de Hulst  (1918-2000)
Claude Elwood Shannon  (1916-2001)
John Wilder Tukey  (1915-2000)

References

1991
1991 in science
1991 in the United Kingdom